Llorac is a rural municipality and village in the comarca of Conca de Barberà in the province of Tarragona in Catalonia, Spain.

The municipality includes the settlements of Llorac, Rauric, La Cirera, Albió, and Montargull.

A twice-daily bus route between Barcelona and Guimerà traverses the municipality.

Economic activity includes the cultivation of cereals, almonds and vines. Garrotxa and other cheeses are produced in Albió.

References

External links
 Official website
 Government data pages 

Municipalities in Conca de Barberà